Turnera panamensis is a species of flowering plant in the passionflower family. It is native to Central America and Northwestern Colombia.

References

External links
 

panamensis